Fachin is a surname. Notable people with the surname include:

 Edson Fachin (born 1958), Brazilian jurist and lawyer
 Eria Fachin (1960–1996), Canadian dance pop singer

See also
 Fachie
 Sachin (given name)